"Ritual" is a song by Dutch disc jockey Tiësto, English disc jockey Jonas Blue and singer Rita Ora from the former's sixth studio album, The London Sessions (2020). The song was penned by Tiësto, Blue, Fraser T. Smith, Grace Barker, Michael Stonebank and Wayne Hector, while produced by the DJs and Stonebank. Marking the first collaboration between the artists, it was released as the second single from the album for digital download and streaming in various countries by Musical Freedom under exclusive license to PM:AM and Universal on 31 May 2019. The love song combines elements of dance-pop and EDM, with a blend of club and tropical house beats. The lyrics evoke the sentiment of eternal love and are a dedication to couples who are limited by space and time. Upon its release, the song received a warm reception from music critics, several of whom highlighted the collaborative effort, the music of it and Ora's vocal delivery. 

"Ritual" reached the number one position in Slovakia as well as the top 10 in the Commonwealth of Independent States (CIS), Croatia, the Czech Republic, Hungary, Russia, Scotland and Poland. The song also reached number 13 on the US Billboard Hot Dance/Electronic Songs, number 24 on the UK Singles Chart and number 99 on the Canadian Hot 100. It received gold certifications in four countries as well as platinum in an additional four countries, including Canada, Norway, Sweden and the United Kingdom. The song received further recognition with a diamond certification in Poland from the Polish Society of the Phonographic Industry (ZPAV). The official music video for the song, displaying Ora performing a series of dances in an alternating neon light setting, was premiered on Tiësto's YouTube channel on 20 June 2019.

Background and composition 

A few days prior to its release, Tiësto, Jonas Blue and Rita Ora announced on their social media accounts that their upcoming single titled "Ritual" was set to be released on 31 May 2019. The song was released on the scheduled date for digital download and streaming in various countries by Musical Freedom under exclusive license to PM:AM and Universal as the second single from Tiësto's sixth studio album The London Sessions (2020). "Ritual" was penned by Tiësto (Tijs Verwest), Jonas Blue (Guy Robin), Fraser T. Smith, Grace Barker, Michael Stonebank and Wayne Hector, with the production completed by Tiësto, Jonas Blue and Stonebank. Marking the first collaboration between the artists, Tiësto stated, "Jonas Blue is such a talented artist and we have been looking for some time for the right project to collaborate on. [...] And Rita's vocals take the track to the next level!" Constructed in verse–chorus form, the song is composed in the key of E minor and time signature of common time with a tempo of 115 beats per minute. The vocal range of Ora in the song spans from a low note of B3 to a high note of D5. With a duration time of three minutes and 18 seconds, it is a dance-pop and EDM love song. The song is built around a synth production, deep house basslines, a progressive drop as well as club and tropical house beats. The lyrics evoke the sentiment of eternal love, dedicated to couples who are limited together by space and time. In the lyrics, Ora sings: "Always love you all through the night/ Be there when the sun is rising/ Oh, you'll always be my ritual."

Reception and promotion 

Upon its release, "Ritual" was met with a warm reception from music critics. Farrell Sweeney from Dancing Astronaut emphasised Ora's "captivating" vocals and the song's ability to blend a "driving instrumentals [...] that's fit for club floors and radio airwaves". Thomas Bleach of The Music Network referred to the song as a "summer fuelled anthem [...] that will have listeners ready to dance". Kate Bein from Billboard also lauded the song as a "shimmering summer [...] tune to get you warmed up". James Weingand for We Rave You considered the song as a choice for those seeking "to kickstart your weekend [...] that has summer written all over it". Mike Wass of Idolator labelled the collaborative effort between the artists as "sexy" and foresaw it as "to destined rule clubs from Iceland to Ibiza". Spotify published a year-end list in 2020 which ranked the song among the best EDM songs.

Peaking at number one in the Slovakia, "Ritual" reached the top 20 in several other countries, including Belgium, the Commonwealth of Independent States (CIS), Croatia, the Czech Republic, Hungary, Ireland, Lebanon, Lithuania, the Netherlands, Russia and Scotland. Other top 60 positions were achieved in Greece, Switzerland, Sweden and Ukraine. In the United States, the song peaked at number 13 on the Hot Dance/Electronic Songs and number 37 on the Dance/Mix Show Airplay rankings. In the United Kingdom, it reached number 24 on the UK Singles Chart and received a platinum certification from the British Phonographic Industry (BPI) for shifting more than 600,000 units in the country. The song earned gold certifications in Belgium, France, Italy and Portugal as well as platinum in Canada, Norway and Sweden. It was further certified diamond by the Polish Society of the Phonographic Industry (ZPAV) for selling more than 250,000 units in Poland.

The music video for "Ritual" premiered to Tiësto's official YouTube channel on 20 June 2019. The three-minute and 17-second video made its broadcast premiere on MTV Live, MTVU and ViacomCBS Times Square billboards on 21 June. Shot in London, it was directed by Sophie Muller and choreographed by Aaron Sillis. The video showcases a series of dance performances by Ora, who is joined by a troupe of dancers in a setting that alternates between different neon lights. Ora is attired in a white cropped tank top and denim jeans by Italian fashion brand Diesel. Althea Legaspi from Rolling Stone complimented the video as having a "sultry" and "colorful" quality, and highlighted Ora's performance, commenting that "[she] hits choreographed cues with her grooving cohorts as she sings [...] about lust's lingering effects". Bein for Billboard also praised the "enchanting" dance moves and Ora's appearance, stating: "She's looking like a gap commercial star [...] it's pretty fantastic."

Track listing 

Digital download and streaming
"Ritual"3:18

Digital download and streaming
"Ritual" (Acoustic)3:24
"Ritual"3:18

Charts

Weekly charts

Monthly charts

Year-end charts

Certifications

Release history

References 

 

2019 singles
2019 songs
Tiësto songs
Jonas Blue songs
Rita Ora songs
Songs written by Tiësto
Songs written by Jonas Blue
Songs written by Wayne Hector
Songs written by Fraser T. Smith
Number-one singles in Slovakia
Universal Music Group singles